The First Congregational Parish Historic District encompasses the oldest church building in Truro, Massachusetts and adjacent historic resources.  The congregation was established in 1711, and is now occupying its third church, a Federal/Greek Revival building erected in 1827.  The tower houses a bell cast by Paul Revere.  Adjacent to the church and part of its setting is the Congregational Cemetery, whose earliest recorded burial is in 1810, and has been associated with the church since its construction.  The cemetery contains a memorial erected in 1841, commemorating the loss of 57 Truro residents and seven ships in a gale on October 3. 1841.

The district was listed on the National Register of Historic Places in 2013.

See also
 National Register of Historic Places listings in Barnstable County, Massachusetts

References

External links
 
 

1711 establishments in Massachusetts
Cemeteries on the National Register of Historic Places in Massachusetts
Cemeteries in Barnstable County, Massachusetts
Churches completed in 1711
Churches in Barnstable County, Massachusetts
Churches on the National Register of Historic Places in Massachusetts
Congregational churches in Massachusetts
Historic districts on the National Register of Historic Places in Massachusetts
National Register of Historic Places in Barnstable County, Massachusetts
Truro, Massachusetts
Cemeteries established in the 1810s